Matthew Wright (born March 22, 1996) is an American football kicker who is currently a free agent. Wright is known for breaking the Jacksonville Jaguars' 20-game losing streak, when he scored two fourth quarter field goals, including a game-winning 53 yarder in an NFL International Series game against the Miami Dolphins in London. Wright played college football at UCF where he was a member of the undefeated 2017 team that was selected as National Champions by the Colley Matrix.

High school career 
Wright attended Lampeter-Strasburg High School in Lampeter, Pennsylvania. As the placekicker on Lampeter-Strasburg's football team, Wright finished his high school kicking career making 15 of 18 attempted kicks, including 9 of 11 as a senior, with a high school career-long of 42 yards. He also converted 122 of 126 extra point kicks in his high school career. Wright was named to the Pennsylvania Football News Class AAA First-team and a Section Two First-team All-Star (as a punter and placekicker). Coming out of high school, Wright was a three-star college kicking prospect and the #46 kicker nationally as ranked by ESPN.

Wright also played high school soccer, earning Lancaster Newspaper's Fall All-Star honors.

College career 

Wright holds the UCF Knights Football records for most career points (375), most field goals made (55), most extra points (PATs), (212, including 153 consecutive made PATs), tied for the best career kicking percentage (.774), and second-best career PAT percentage (.985).

Wright was redshirted his true freshman season before going on to be the Knights primary placekicker for the next four seasons.

In 2014, as a true freshman, Wright earned American Athletic Conference All-Academic Team honors.

In 2015, as a redshirt freshman, Wright made 13 of 17 field goal attempts (.765) with a long of 48 yards while recording one tackle.

In 2016, as a redshirt sophomore, Wright became one of just 11 Knights ever to make a 50-yard field goal attempt. Making 17 of 22 field goal attempts (.772) (50-yard long) during the 2016 season, Wright's .773 kicking percentage placed seventh all-time in UCF football history for single season kick percentage. Wright was named to the 2016-17 American All-Academic Team.

Entering his redshirt junior season in 2017, Wright was named to the Lou Groza Award preseason watch list (best placekicker in college football). Wright also handled kickoff specialist duties during the 2017 season. Following Wright's performance against the Memphis, Wright was named the American Special Teams Player of the Week. In the Knights' game versus Austin Peay, Wright set the UCF single-game extra points record (10). On January 1, 2018, Wright made two field goals against the Auburn in the Peach Bowl as the Knights finished their season 13-0. After the victory, the school announced they would claim a National Championship despite not making the College Football Playoff and never being ranked higher than 10th. Wright finished the 2017 season making 13 of 18 field goal attempts (.722) with a long of 47 yards. With his 2017 season performance, Wright set the UCF Knights single-season record for most kicking points scored (119), the second-most points scored in a season, and the most extra points in a season (80). Wright earned Second-team All-American Athletic Conference honors.

In 2018, Wright again served as both UCF's placekicker and kickoff specialist. In back-to-back weeks following the Knights' games against Memphis and East Carolina University, Wright was named the American Athletic Conference Special Teams Player of the Week. Wright finished the season converting 12 of 14 field goal attempts (.857) with a long of 46 yards. In successfully converting all 74 PATs, Wright became only the eighth player in UCF program history to make every PAT in a season. Wright ended the season with a 58.3-yard kickoff average, including 29 touchbacks, with two tackles and a fumble recovery. Wright earned American Athletic Conference Second-team honors for his 2018 senior kicking efforts.

Wright also earned the University of Central Florida's most prestigious honor, the Order of the Pegasus Award, for exemplary performance in "academic achievement, outstanding university involvement, leadership, and community service."

Collegiate statistics

Professional career

Pittsburgh Steelers
Wright was signed by the Pittsburgh Steelers as an undrafted free agent following the 2019 NFL Draft. He was waived on August 31, 2019, during final roster cuts.

Tampa Bay Vipers
On October 16, 2019, Wright was selected by the Tampa Bay Vipers in Phase 5 of the 2020 XFL Draft. On January 22, 2020, he was released during training camp.

Pittsburgh Steelers (second stint)
On November 30, 2020, Wright was re-signed by the Steelers to their practice squad. He was elevated to the active roster on December 7, December 26, and January 2, 2021, for the team's weeks 13, 16, and 17 games against the Washington Football Team, Indianapolis Colts, and Cleveland Browns, and reverted to the practice squad after each game. Wright was two-of-two on extra points against Washington, and made his first career field goal from 37 yards out. Wright finished the season having made all four of his field goal attempts, including a long of 46 yards, and all seven extra point attempts. On January 18, 2021, following the season, Wright's practice squad contract with the team expired.

Detroit Lions
On January 22, 2021, the Detroit Lions signed Wright to a reserve/futures contract. On August 10, 2021, the Lions waived Wright.

Jacksonville Jaguars
On September 27, 2021, Wright was signed to the Jacksonville Jaguars practice squad. On October 16, 2021, he was signed to the Jaguars' active roster.

On October 10, 2021, Wright got his first start in the Jaguars' Week 5 game against the Tennessee Titans. He went 0/1, missing a 53-yard field goal and 1/2 on extra points.

On October 17, 2021, in an NFL International Series game played in London, England against the Miami Dolphins, Wright went 3/3 on field goals, including a career-long 54-yard field goal and a game-winning 53-yard field goal that snapped the Jaguars' 20-game losing streak and gave them their first win since September 13, 2020. For his performance he was awarded AFC Special Teams Player Of The Week. On October 19, 2021, Wright was named the starter going forward as Jacksonville cut former starter, Josh Lambo, from their roster.

On May 11, 2022, Wright was waived.

Kansas City Chiefs
Wright was signed to the Kansas City Chiefs' practice squad on September 27, 2022. He was elevated to the active roster on October 1, 2022, and then reverted back to the practice squad after the game. He was elevated again on October 10, 2022. In the Chiefs' week 5 game against the Las Vegas Raiders, he broke what was at the time the Chiefs' franchise record for longest field goal with a 59-yard field goal.

Pittsburgh Steelers (third stint)
On November 9, 2022, Wright was signed by the Pittsburgh Steelers off the Chiefs practice squad. He was released on December 10, 2022.

Kansas City Chiefs (second stint)
Wright was signed to the Kansas City Chiefs practice squad on January 6, 2023. That same day, he was elevated to the active roster via a standard elevation. However, he did not play and was inactive for the Chiefs week 18 game against the Las Vegas Raiders. He was released on January 30, 2023.

NFL career statistics

Personal life 
As a senior at UCF, Wright worked as an aerospace engineering intern at Lockheed Martin. Following his graduation from UCF in December 2018, Lockheed Martin offered Wright a full-time job with the company, which Wright accepted and worked until September 2021.

References

External links
 UCF Knights bio

1996 births
Living people
People from Lancaster, Pennsylvania
Players of American football from Pennsylvania
American football placekickers
UCF Knights football players
Pittsburgh Steelers players
Tampa Bay Vipers players
Detroit Lions players
Jacksonville Jaguars players
Kansas City Chiefs players